Killowen Primary School may refer to:
 Killowen Primary School (Coleraine), County Londonderry, Northern Ireland
 Killowen Primary School (Killowen), Killowen, County Down, Northern Ireland